Lake Tașaul is a lake in Northern Dobruja, Romania. Formerly an open salt water coastal lagoon, connected with the Black Sea, it was transformed into a freshwater lake in the 1920s.

References

Lakes of Constanța County
Important Bird Areas of Romania